Muqabla is 1993 Hindi-language film directed by T. Rama Rao, starring Aditya Pancholi, Govinda, Karishma Kapoor and Paresh Rawal. Other cast includes Shakti Kapoor, Asrani, Aruna Irani and Farah Naaz. It is a remake of the 1992 Telugu film Police Brothers.

Plot 
Suraj and Deepak live a poor lifestyle in a village along with their widowed father, who has always taught them to be honest. Both re-locate to the city and find employment with the Police Force, while Suraj is a Havaldar and Deepak is a Traffic Constable. Suraj does his job honestly and diligently and is often reprimanded by Inspector Waghmare.

Then differences arise between Suraj and Deepak when the later comes to testify in favor of an accused, Narendra Khanna, who was arrested by Suraj for killing a man. Things come to a boil when Soni's husband is brutally murdered in broad daylight, and when officers of both Shaitaan Chowki and Kala Chowki refuse to investigate nor even register this homicide, she decides to take matters into her own hands. Her case is then presented in front of the court.

It turns out to be that Narendra Kumar is not a single person but are twins about which the world is unaware. Deepak presents both the twins in front of the court. The judge takes both the twins in judicial custody. After this the problems between the two brothers, i.e. Deepak and Suraj, get resolved. Deepak plans to go to his village with Suraj to surprise their father, he goes out to buy some shawls and is kidnapped by Narendra and his men. They torture him and call Suraj to mock him. As soon as Suraj reaches to Deepak who is heavily injured and Deepak finds a bomb attached to him. Since he doesn't want to get anyone killed Deepak jumps into the waterfall resulting in his death.

After this incident all the hawaldars go rogue and start a mutiny. The hawaldars go on a killing spree along with Suraj. A fight starts between Khanna and Suraj. The fight ends with the death of Khanna by the hands of Suraj.

Cast 
 Govinda as Police Constable Suraj 
 Aditya Pancholi as Traffic Constable Deepak 
 Karishma Kapoor as Karishma 
 Farha Naaz as Vandana
 Arun Govil as Police Inspector Constable Satyaprakash
 Tej Sapru as Police Inspector Waghmare at Kalachowki Police Station 
 Satyendra Kapoor as Suraj's and Deepak's father
 Aruna Irani as Soni 
 Asrani as Soni's husband
 Paresh Rawal as Communications Minister Jaganath 'Jaggu' Mishra 
 Shakti Kapoor as Khanna Saahab
 Vikas Anand as Superintendent of Police
 Y. G. Mahendran as Police Constable Saajan
 Ali as Thief at Kala Chowky Police Station

Soundtrack

External links 
 

1993 films
1990s Hindi-language films
Films directed by T. Rama Rao
Films scored by Dilip Sen-Sameer Sen
Indian action films
Fictional portrayals of the Maharashtra Police
Hindi remakes of Telugu films
1993 action films